Colborne is a civil parish in Restigouche County, New Brunswick, Canada.

For governance purposes it is divided between the town of Heron Bay, the Moose Meadows 4 Indian reserve, and the Restigouche rural district; the town and rural district are both members of the Restigouche Regional Service Commission.

Prior to the 2023 governance reform, the parish was divided between the village of Charlo, the Indian reserve, and the local service districts of Charleur and Lorne. In the 2023 reform, Charlo merged with the town of Dalhousie to form Heron Bay, which annexed Heron Island and the communities of Benjamin River, Blackland, and New Mills from Chaleur; Lorne and the remainder of Chaleur became part of the rural district.

Origin of name
The parish was named in honour of John Colborne, acting Governor General of the Canadas when the parish was erected.

History
Colborne was erected in 1840 from Addington and Beresford Parishes. Colborne comprised Restigouche County between the Benjamin and Eel Rivers.

In 1850 the boundaries were altered to run due south from starting points near the coast: the western boundary from milepost forty-eight on the great road (highway) from Bathurst to Dalhousie, the eastern boundary from the mouth of the Benjamin River.

Boundaries
Colborne Parish is bounded:

 on the north by Chaleur Bay;
 on the east by a line running true south from the mouth of Benjamin River to the Northumberland County line;
 on the south by the county line;
 on the west by a line running true south from a point near the northern end of the Eel River Bar Seawall to the county line
 including Heron Island and any islands in front of the parish.

Communities
Communities at least partly within the parish. bold indicates an incorporated municipality or Indian reserve

 Benjamin River
 Blackland
 Caribou Depot
 Lorne
 Moose Meadows 4
 New Mills
 Upper Crossing
 Charlo
 Mountain Brook
 River Charlo
 Upper Charlo

Bodies of water
Bodies of water at least partly within the parish.

 Benjamin River
 North Branch Charlo River
 Jacquet River
 Louison River
 South Charlo River
 Southeast Upsalquitch River
 Tetagouche River
 Harrys Bogan
 Nash Creek
 Chaleur Bay
 Heron Channel
 Shoal Bay
 at least ten officially named lakes

Islands
Islands at least partly within the parish.
 Fleming Island
 Heron Island
 West Point Island
 Thrum Rock

Other notable places
Parks, historic sites, and other noteworthy places at least partly within the parish.
 Chaleur Provincial Park
 Charlo Regional Airport
 Eel River Bar Seawall
 Key Anacon Mine

Demographics
Parish population total does not include Moose Meadows 4 Indian reserve or portion within the formaer incorporated village of Charlo. Revised census figures based on the 2023 local governance reforms have not been released.

Population

Language

Access Routes
Highways and numbered routes that run through the parish, including external routes that start or finish at the parish limits:

Highways

Principal Routes

Secondary Routes:
None

External Routes:
None

See also
List of parishes in New Brunswick

Notes

References

Parishes of Restigouche County, New Brunswick